Thomas Ice is an American theologian and author of books on biblical prophecy.

Education and career 
Ice received his BA from Howard Payne University in 1975, his masters in theology from Dallas Theological Seminary in 1981, and a PhD from Tyndale Theological Seminary in 1995.  He performed post-doctoral studies in church history at the University of Wales.

Ice is the executive director of the Pre-Trib Research Center on the campus of Liberty University in Lynchburg, Virginia.  The research center was founded in 1994 by Tim LaHaye and Ice to research, teach, proclaim, and defend pre-tribulationism. The center currently sponsors prophecy meetings and conferences and provides speakers for the purpose of discussion and lecture on the topic of pre-tribulationism.

Ice has taught at Liberty University. He moved to Calvary University in 2018. He lives in Lee's Summit, Missouri, with his wife Janice.

Selected books

References

External links 
Pre-Trib Research Center

Christian writers about eschatology
American Christian Zionists
Living people
Howard Payne University alumni
Dallas Theological Seminary alumni
People from Lee's Summit, Missouri
Year of birth missing (living people)